Charles Franklin Reaugh (December 29, 1860 – May 6, 1945), known as Frank Reaugh, was an American artist, photographer, inventor, patron of the arts, and teacher, who was called the "Dean of Texas Painters". Born and raised in Illinois, he moved as a youth with his family to Texas. There he developed an art career devoted to portraying Texas Longhorns, and the animals and landscapes of the vast regions of the Great Plains and the American Southwest. He worked in both pastels and oil paints and was a prolific artist, producing more than 7,000 known works. He was active in the Society of Western Artists.

Early years
Reaugh was born in 1860 near Jacksonville, the seat of Morgan County in west central Illinois, to George Washington Reaugh, who had worked as a miner in the California gold rush, and the former Clarinda Morton Spilman. Reaugh (pronounced RAY), moved with his parents and family in 1876 to Terrell in Kaufman County east of Dallas. The original family name was "Castelreaugh", but his Irish immigrant ancestors had shortened it to "Reaugh" when they entered the United States. The Reaughs initially made their living in Terrell by cultivating cotton, still a major commodity crop in East Texas.

Reaugh developed his skills by copying the works of European masters from magazines and illustrations of larger animals found in anatomy books. He studied the writings of naturalists Louis Agassiz and John Burroughs.

In the early 1880s, he was invited by the cattlemen brothers Frank and Romie Houston to join them on cattle drives near Wichita Falls in Wichita County south of the Red River. The Houstons may have also provided financial support for Reaugh to further his  artistic studies. Reaugh was inspired by these drives: riding horseback next to a huge herd of cattle, seeing wild birds and animals, and traveling through a wide variety of landscapes.

Art education and career
During the winter of 1884–1885, Reaugh studied at the St. Louis School of Fine Arts in St. Louis, Missouri. In 1888 he sailed to France, where for the next year he studied at the Académie Julian in Paris. Here he became interested in pastels at The Louvre museum. Influenced by the works of Georges de La Tour and realist Anton Mauve, he also studied Flemish and Dutch paintings in Belgium and the Netherlands, where he was inspired by the work of Paulus Potter.

After his return to the US, in 1890, the Reaughs moved from Terrell to the Oak Cliff section of Dallas. There, he and his father built a metal studio building in the back yard, which he called "The Iron Shed". Reaugh's art works soon gained attention and even national recognition, as he gained art exhibitions at the World's Fairs in Chicago (1893) and St. Louis (1904).

Prolific painter

In total, Reaugh created more than seven thousand works. He concentrated on small plein air pastel sketches of the iconic Texas Longhorn, a subject he found challenging to portray. He once said that "no animal on earth has the beauty of the Texas steer."

Reaugh recalled that his mother had particularly encouraged him in the mastery of painting true-to-life forms. He said, "I would sit in the midst of the herds to study their form, the workings of their muscles, their character and habits, their characteristic spots and markings, and their wonderfully rich and varied colors."

His best-known paintings include:
Watering the Herd (1889)
The O Roundup (1894)Grazing the Herd (1897)The Approaching Herd (1902)Twenty-Four Hours with the Herd (seven paintings, after 1930)Texas Cattle (April 1933, his last major work)

Inventor
Reaugh created his own art materials and tools, including a patented folding lap easel and compact carrying case for pastels. He created and marketed his own brand of pastels, each cast in a hexagonal shape to facilitate handling in the field.

He also patented a rotary pump for commercial use. He served on the board of directors for the Limacon Pump Company in Dallas.

Art instructor

Reaugh established an art school in Dallas in 1897. He was a model artist and an influential arts educator. For many years, Reaugh led groups of art students on sketching expeditions throughout West Texas, ranging into New Mexico and Arizona.  His colleagues Charles Peter Bock and Louis Oscar Griffith sometimes accompanied him on these trips.

Many of his students, including Reveau Bassett, Florence McClung, Harry Carnohan, Lucretia Donnell, John Douglass, Olin H. Travis, Edward G. Eisenlohr, Lloyd Goff, Alexandre Hogue, and Josephine Oliver, gained regional and national prominence.  Several of these became part of the group known as the Dallas Nine. (Donnell, one of Reaugh's last students, has continued her mentor's tradition of taking students on sketching trips.)

In 1900, the Dallas Morning News employed Reaugh as a weekly art commentator and reporter. He taught briefly at Baylor University, and gave illustrated lectures in the art department of Texas Christian University.

Reaugh helped found the Dallas Art Society (which later developed as the Dallas Museum of Art), The Frank Reaugh Art Club, and the Striginian Club. Frank Reaugh also championed the creation of the Dallas Museum of Art in the early twentieth century.

Legacy

Several of his paintings are displayed at the Texas State Capitol in Austin. Many of his other works are held by the Panhandle-Plains Historical Museum at West Texas A&M University in Canyon. Fellow painter Harold Dow Bugbee, a former curator of the museum, is also featured there. Other Reaugh works are at the Southwest Collection/Special Library Collection at Texas Tech University in Lubbock, and the Harry Ransom Humanities Research Center at the University of Texas at Austin.

In February 1936, the aging Reaugh said that his painting ". . . aside from any artistic merit that they may possess, will tell their story, and will be preserved because of historical value; for the steer and the cowboy have gone, the range has been fenced and plowed, and the beauty of the early days is but a memory."

Reaugh's interest was focused on the animals and natural environment of Texas and the Southwest. This was in contrast to Frederic Remington or Charles M. Russell, whose works stressed confrontation between man and nature. Reaugh saw the ideal of pastoral harmony through the herds that roamed across the prairie.

With the help of Lucretia Donnell, Reaugh wrote an autobiography entitled From Under the Mesquite Tree: An Artist's Life on the Texas Plains (2005). Historian J. Evetts Haley in 1960 published F. Reaugh: Man and Artist.

In Reaugh's will, dated May 16, 1940, filed before his death in Dallas County, the painter noted, 
“The main part of my property is in pictures… These are largely of the great prairies of Texas and the longhorned cattle of fifty years ago . . . It is my wish that these pictures be kept together if only for historical reasons. They create the spirit of the time. They show the sky unsullied by smoke, and the broad opalescent prairies not disfigured by wire fences or other signs of man."

Having given away most of his possessions, Reaugh died in poverty in Dallas in 1945 at the age of eighty-four. He had vowed years earlier never to live anywhere outside of Texas. He is buried in Terrell Cemetery.

In 2007, the exhibition The Pastel Range: Frank Reaugh, Ranch Historian was shown at the National Ranching Heritage Center in Lubbock, Texas. In 2015, the Harry Ranson Center in Austin, Texas, staged the retrospective exhibit "Frank Reaugh: Landscapes of Texas and the American West"  and published the related book, Windows on the West: The Art of Frank Reaugh.

References

Sources
Michael R. Grauer. Rounded Up in Glory: Frank Reaugh, Texas Renaissance Man.'' Denton University of North Texas Press, 2016.

External links

Frank Reaugh: Landscapes of Texas and the American West  exhibition at the Harry Ransom Center in 2015
Frank Reaugh Collection at the Harry Ransom Center, University of Texas at Austin
Texas Capitol Historical Art Collection
Handbook of Texas Online – Charles Franklin Reaugh
Frank Reaugh Gallery at the Panhandle Plains Historical Museum
Frank Reaugh at Askart.com
Papers, 1902–1960, in the Southwest Collection/Special Collections Library at Texas Tech University
The Frank Reaugh digital collection from the Harry Ransom Center at The University of Texas at Austin.

1860 births
1945 deaths
People from Jacksonville, Illinois
People from Terrell, Texas
People from Dallas
19th-century American painters
19th-century American male artists
American male painters
20th-century American painters
Painters from Illinois
Painters from Texas
20th-century American photographers
19th-century American inventors
American art educators
19th-century American photographers
Photographers from Illinois
Photographers from Texas
20th-century American inventors
Artists from Texas
Artists of the American West
20th-century American male artists